The Jerusalem Fund for Education and Community Development is a 501(c)(3) non-profit organization based in Foggy Bottom, Washington, D.C. It focuses on educational and humanitarian work on behalf of Palestinians, particularly those living in the Occupied Territories and surrounding refugee camps. Since its formation in 1977, The Jerusalem Fund has invested in the potential of the Palestinian people through community development initiatives and direct financial assistance to primary health and basic education projects, grassroots and civil society initiatives, and educational programs in the United States about Palestine and the Palestinians. To implement its mission, The Jerusalem Fund maintains four programs: the Palestine Center, Gallery Al-Quds, the Palestine Diabetes Institute, and the Humanitarian Link.

Grants
The Jerusalem Fund receives funding through investment income as well as from private individuals.  Funds are used to support grants to organizations throughout Palestine and to offer quality speakers at The Jerusalem Fund's headquarters.

Board of directors
The Jerusalem Fund is composed of nine board members serving on various sub-committees.  The three sub-committees are: the executive committee composed of the board chairman, secretary, and treasurer; the Grants and Finance Committee, composed of the board chairman, treasurer, and board members Dr. Mohayya Khilfeh, Dr. Tawfiq Ramadan, Walid Keilani and Dr. Sari Nabulsi; and the Palestine Center Committee composed of the executive committee, board members Dr. Mohayya Khilfeh and George Hishmeh, and noted scholars Dr. Edmund Ghareeb and Dr. Halim Barakat.

Members
Subhi D. Ali, M.D., F.A.C.S., is chairman of the board.
Omar J. Fayez, Esq., is secretary of the board.
Eid B. Mustafa, M.D., F.A.C.S., is treasurer of the board.
Zeina Azzam is executive director of The Jerusalem Fund and its educational program, The Palestine Center. She is a member (ex officio) of the board and its three sub-committees, in addition to functioning as its assistant secretary and assistant treasurer.
George Hishmeh, journalist, is a founding member of the Jerusalem Fund.
Walid Keilani is president of ASG Real Estate Company and senior financial adviser of Alshall Group.
Mohayya H. Khilfeh, M.D., M.P.H., is a pediatrician at the South Holland Health Center, Illinois.
Sari A. Nabulsi, M.D., M.B.A., is a pediatrician at the Pediatric Medical Center and a pediatrics professor at Texas Tech University, Midland, TX.
Tawfik Z. Ramadan, M.D., M.P.H., is a pediatrician at Southern Oklahoma Pediatrics, a private practice, and Neonatology director of the Neonatal Intensive Care Unit at Valley View Regional Hospital in Ada, Oklahoma.

Deceased members
Hisham Sharabi, Ph.D. (1927-2005), was chairman of the board from 1977 to 2005 and a founding member of The Jerusalem Fund.
Samih Farsoun, Ph.D. (1937-2005), was one of the first members of The Jerusalem Fund Board of Directors, and was a founding member of the Center for Policy Analysis on Palestine, now the Palestine Center.

The Palestine Center
The Palestine Center is an independent educational program committed to communicating reliable and objective information about the Palestinian political experience to American policy makers, journalists, students, and the general public. Established in 1991, it is the educational branch of The Jerusalem Fund.

The Humanitarian Link
The Humanitarian Link is the charitable wing of The Jerusalem Fund.  The Humanitarian Link gives small grants to needy hospitals, schools, orphanages and nongovernmental organizations.  According to The Jerusalem Fund website, "Strict reporting requirements and regular visits by Jerusalem Fund staff ensure the proper distribution of funds and project monitoring."

The Palestine Diabetes Institute
The Palestine Diabetes Institute address the growing diabetes epidemic in Palestine through treatment, awareness, and education. It is the first such facility in Palestine.

Gallery Al-Quds
Since 2000, the Gallery Al-Quds has been the sole, full-time area showcase for the exhibition of contemporary art by Arab-American and Arab artists. The Gallery specializes in the work of Palestinian artists, with an additional emphasis on the work of contemporary artists whose art centers on issues of the Arab and Islamic worlds. The gallery exhibits work in a full range of media including painting, sculpture, photography, film, and mixed media.

References

External links
The Jerusalem Fund

Foreign charities operating in the State of Palestine
Think tanks based in Washington, D.C.
Palestinian arts
Medical and health organizations based in the State of Palestine
Think tanks established in 1977
1977 establishments in Washington, D.C.